Albert Jean Charles Ghislain Houssiau (born 2 November 1924) is a Belgian prelate of the Catholic Church. He served as bishop of Liège from 1986 to 2001.

Houssiau was born in November 1924 and was ordained a priest on February 6, 1949. He was appointed bishop of Liège on March 17, 1986 by Pope John Paul II, and was consecrated on May 18, 1986. He held the post until his retirement on May 9, 2001.

At age , Houssiau is the oldest living Catholic bishop from Belgium.

References

External links

1924 births
Living people
20th-century Roman Catholic bishops in Belgium
Bishops of Liège
People from Halle, Belgium